Paul Spicer (born August 18, 1975) is an American football coach and former defensive end who is the defensive line coach for the San Antonio Brahmas of the XFL. He played college football at Saginaw Valley State. He then played 12 seasons in the National Football League (NFL) from 1998 to 2009, the majority of his career with the Jacksonville Jaguars. He was signed by the Seattle Seahawks as an undrafted free agent in 1998.

In his playing days, Spicer also was a member of the Saskatchewan Roughriders, Detroit Lions, and New Orleans Saints.

Early years
Spicer attended Northwest High School in Indianapolis, Indiana.

College career

DuPage
Spicer attended the College of DuPage in Glen Ellyn, Illinois for two years, where he played for legendary coach Bob McDougal. As a sophomore, he was a JUCO All-American linebacker and helped lead the Chaparrals to 24 straight wins.

Saginaw Valley State
Paul was a two-year starter at Saginaw Valley State University where he played for former University of Minnesota and Northern Illinois University head coach Jerry Kill. He missed most of his junior year with a broken fibula. He was named MVP of the GLICA conference in 1998 posted 16.5 sacks during his senior season.

Professional career

Seattle Seahawks
Spicer was signed as an undrafted free agent by the Seattle Seahawks in 1998 but was waived before the start of the season.

Saskatchewan Roughriders
After his release from the Seahawks, Spicer played part of the 1998 season with the Saskatchewan Roughriders of the Canadian Football League.

Detroit Lions
Spicer was signed by the Detroit Lions and was on the practice squad for most of the 1999 season.

Jacksonville Jaguars
Spicer was signed by the Jacksonville Jaguars in 2000 but only played in three games. In 2001, he was allocated by the Jaguars to play with the Frankfurt Galaxy in NFL Europe. His best season with the Jaguars came in 2005 when he accumulated 37 tackles (30 solo), 7.5 sacks, and two pass deflections. Spicer helped lead the Jaguars to their first playoff berth in six years.

On February 28, 2009, Spicer was cut from the Jaguars.

New Orleans Saints
Spicer agreed to terms on a one-year contract with the New Orleans Saints on March 17, 2009.

Spicer was released on September 5, 2009 and remained a free agent until being re-signed on January 5, 2010 after defensive end Charles Grant was placed on injured reserve.

Jacksonville Jaguars
On February 23, 2011, the Jacksonville Jaguars signed Paul Spicer to a one-day contract so the defensive end could retire as a member of the team that he started his career with.

Coaching career

Jacksonville Jaguars
On February 24, 2011, Spicer's one day contract with the Jaguars expired, officially retiring him from the NFL. Spicer was hired as the assistant defensive line coach by the Jacksonville Jaguars.

Tampa Bay Buccaneers
On February 26, 2015, Spicer was hired as the assistant defensive line coach for the Tampa Bay Buccaneers, reuniting him with defensive line coach Joe Cullen.

New Orleans Breakers 
On March 17, 2022, it was announced that Spicer would be hired as the Defensive Line coach for the New Orleans Breakers of the United States Football League.

San Antonio Brahmas 
Spicer was officially hired by the San Antonio Brahmas of the XFL to be their Defensive Line coach on September 13, 2022

Personal life
Spicer is a former a co-host of In to the End Zone on WJXT. Spicer has a wife named Shariffa and has five children.

He was reunited with some of his paternal relatives through the WE TV show "The Locator" on an episode that aired September 19, 2009.

Acting
Spicer has a speaking part in The Year of Getting to Know Us, a movie that was filmed in Jacksonville. The film stars Jimmy Fallon and Tom Arnold. The producers of the movie needed a burly security guard who could toss Fallon out of an airplane for a scene at Jacksonville International Airport.

References

External links

Jacksonville Jaguars bio
New Orleans Saints bio

1975 births
Living people
American football defensive ends
American football linebackers
American male film actors
American players of Canadian football
Canadian football defensive linemen
Canadian football linebackers
College of DuPage Chaparrals football players
Detroit Lions players
Frankfurt Galaxy players
Jacksonville Jaguars coaches
Jacksonville Jaguars players
Male actors from Indianapolis
New Orleans Saints players
Players of American football from Indianapolis
Players of Canadian football from Indianapolis
Saginaw Valley State Cardinals football players
Saskatchewan Roughriders players
Seattle Seahawks players
Tampa Bay Buccaneers coaches
New Orleans Breakers (2022) coaches
Ed Block Courage Award recipients